R v Gladue is a decision of the Supreme Court of Canada on the sentencing principles that are outlined under s. 718.2(e) of the Criminal Code. That provision, enacted by Parliament in 1995, directs the courts to take into consideration "all available sanctions, other than imprisonment" for all offenders.  It adds that the courts are to pay "particular attention to the circumstances of Aboriginal offenders".

Gladue was the first case where the Supreme Court considered the interpretation and application of this provision.  It upheld the three year sentence for manslaughter which the sentencing judge gave to Gladue, but also set out factors which the sentencing courts are to take into account in applying s. 718.2(10(e).

In the years since the decision, sentencing judges have directed that to assist in sentencing Indigenous offenders, pre-sentencing reports be prepared to assess the factors which the Supreme Court has identified as being considered under s. 718.2(1(e).  That type of report has become known as a "Gladue report."

In 2012, in R v Ipeelee, the Supreme Court confirmed the basic principles it had set out in R v Gladue.

1995 Amendments to the Criminal Code 

In 1995, the federal government introduced major changes to the sentencing provisions of the Criminal Code.  As part of that review, the package included amendments that responded to the over-representation of Indigenous peoples in the correctional systems of Canada.  At that time, Indigenous peoples amounted to approximately 18% of the total of incarcerated individuals, but were only 3% of the total population of Canada, an over-representation of more than 5 times their total population.

The amendments included a new provision setting out general sentencing principles.  The relevant provision was the new s. 718.2(1)(e):

Facts of the case 

On September 16, 1995, Jamie Tanis Gladue, a young Indigenous woman, was celebrating her birthday with some friends in Nanaimo, British Columbia. She suspected that her boyfriend was having an affair with her older sister. Following a confrontation, her boyfriend repeatedly insulted Gladue, at which point she stabbed him in the chest. He died.  At the time of the stabbing, Gladue had a blood alcohol level of between 155 and 165 milligrams of alcohol in 100 millilitres of blood.

Lower court decisions 
Gladue was originally charged with second degree murder, but pled guilty to  manslaughter, with the consent of the Crown prosecutor, on the basis that there was evidence of provocation.  The main issue was the appropriate sentence to be imposed. She was sentenced to three years imprisonment.  

At Gladue's sentencing hearing, the sentencing judge took into account both aggravating and mitigating factors, including the absence of any serious criminal history. However, the sentencing judge did not take into account any factors specifically relating to Gladue's Indigenous background. The sentencing judge also held that s. 718.2(e) did not apply to Indigenous people who were off-reserve. The British Columbia Court of Appeal disagreed with the sentencing judge on that point, but by a 2-1 judgment, upheld the sentence.  Both the sentencing judge and the majority of the Court of Appeal held that the offence was a serious one, and that a three year sentence was appropriate in any event, even if the Indigenous background were taken into account.

Reasons of the Supreme Court

The Supreme Court upheld the sentence of three years, but reviewed the factors which should be considered in the new sentencing provision, s. 718.2(e). Justices Cory and Iacobucci held that the courts below erred in taking an overly narrow approach of s. 718.2(e). The purpose of this provision is to address the historical and current problem with the severe over-representation of Indigenous people within the criminal justice system.

Gladue was not on reserve land at the time of the offence and therefore the sentencing judge held that s. 718.2(e) did not apply. The Supreme Court held that was a mistake by the sentencing court. The Court held that s. 718.2(e) applies to "all aboriginal persons wherever they reside, whether on- or off-reserve, in a large city or a rural area".

Gladue reports 

Following the Supreme Court decision, sentencing courts began requiring pre-sentencing reports for aboriginal offenders, to specifically report on the factors which the Supreme Court held were required by s. 718.2(e), which Parliament had enacted in an attempt to lower the severe over-representation of Indigenous people within the Canadian criminal justice system.  These reports became known as Gladue reports.  Some of the items included in Gladue reports include the tragic history, cultural oppression, poverty, abuse suffered and residential school attendance of the Indigenous offender.

See also
 Gladue court
 Gladue report
Healing lodge
Indigenous Peoples and the Canadian Criminal Justice System
 List of Supreme Court of Canada cases (Lamer Court)
R v Ipeelee
 R v Wells

References 

Supreme Court of Canada cases
1999 in Canadian case law
Canadian criminal case law
Canadian Aboriginal case law